There is a small community of Indians in Brazil who are mainly immigrants and expatriates from India. There are currently about 9,200 people of Indian origin living in the country and a majority of them live in São Paulo and Rio de Janeiro. There are also a number of people of Indian origin (mainly from the former colony of Portuguese Goa) who came to Brazil from both Britain's and Portugal's African colonies in the later half of the twentieth century.

Migration history

Early Indian presence in Brazil
The earliest Indians to arrive in Brazil were Indian seamen or Lascars, known as "Lascarim" in Portuguese. They arrived between the sixteenth and mid-seventeenth century, when the most important parts of the Portuguese Empire were their colonies in Asia. These included Diu, Daman, Bombay, Thana, Goa, Cochin and some smaller settlements in Hugli River.

Later as the settlement of coastal Brazil developed, many governors, Catholic clerics, and soldiers who had formally served in Asia arrived with their Asian wives, concubines, servants and slaves. Later Luso-Indian servants and clerics connected with the religious orders, such as the Jesuits and Franciscans, and spice cultivators arrived in Brazil.

In the eighteenth century there were Luso-Indians arriving in Brazil on ships of the English East India Company.

20th century Indian Immigration to Brazil
 The first wave of Indian immigration to Brazil began when a small number of Sindhis had arrived there from Suriname and Central America (mainly from Belize and Panama) in the 1960s to set up shop as traders in the city of Manaus. 
 The second wave of immigration consisted of university professors to Rio de Janeiro from Bangalore, Goa, and New Delhi who arrived in the 1960s and also in the 1970s. 
 Other people of Indian Origin migrated to that country from various African countries, mainly from former Portuguese colonies (especially Mozambique), soon after their independence in the 1970s. The number of PIOs in Brazil has been augmented in recent years by the arrival of nuclear scientists and computer professionals.

Current status
There are as many as 1,500 PIOs and only 400 NRIs besides the descendants and only since foreign nationals can acquire local citizenship without any discrimination after 15 years of domicile in this country. Brazil has also no bar against dual citizenship, although India does ban its citizens from obtaining dual citizenship. But in recent years, it has been granting immigration visas only in high technology fields. The only exceptions are the Sindhis in Manaus and the immigrants and descendants in Rio de Janeiro and São Paulo.

Most of the Indians living in Brazil have not only been able to assimilate themselves in the Brazilian way of life but also maintain close cultural and economic connection with India.

Notable people
 Suresh Biswas (1861–1905), adventurer from British India
 Ashok Gandotra (born 1948), cricketer
 Froilano de Mello (1887–1955), microbiologist from Goa
 Nathalia Kaur (born 1990), model, Bollywood actress and opera singer
 Edu (born 1978), former footballer
 Sadhan Kumar Adhikari, Brazilian physicist

See also
 Asian Latin Americans
 Brazilians in India
 Caminho das Índias
 Romani people in Brazil

References

Brazil
Brazil
 
Asian Brazilian
Indian Latin American